Carole Lesley (27 May 1935 – 28 February 1974), was a British actress who had a short but significant career as a "blonde bombshell".

She was born Maureen Rippingale in Chelmsford, Essex, but ran away from home at the age of 16, "aiming to become a star".

She starred in several films in the late 1950s and early 1960s, including the 1957 film Woman in a Dressing Gown, which won the 1958 Golden Globe Award for Best English-Language Foreign Film. She also appeared in No Trees in the Street, These Dangerous Years, Doctor in Love, Operation Bullshine and What a Whopper, and played Helen of Troy in a television play.

However, Associated decided to end her contract, which devastated her and she disappeared from the public eye. She subsequently lived in a semi-detached house overlooking New Barnet station in north London, but by 1973 was described as "a deeply depressed, once beautiful woman, still haunted by a glamorous past".

She was found dead by her husband Michael Dalling in their New Barnet home on 28 February 1974. At her inquest it was determined that she had died of a drug overdose and that she had "killed herself".

Filmography

References

External links 

Deborah Orr article featuring photo of Carole Lesley
Carole Lesley - 'The actress who never went to Hollywood' featuring several Pathe News clips

1935 births
1974 deaths
English film actresses
20th-century English actresses
Actors from Chelmsford
Drug-related suicides in England
1974 suicides